The Swisshelm Mountains are a small mountain range adjacent to the southwest corner of the Chiricahua Mountains of eastern Cochise County, Arizona. They are separated from the Pedrogosa Mountains to the southeast, the Chiricahuas to the northeast, and by Leslie Creek, bordering the south and east; the area is now notable for the Leslie Canyon National Wildlife Refuge.

The mountain range is named for John Swisshelm, a miner, a local settler of the late 1800s.

Range 
The range is a north-south range, with three notable peaks. In the north, an unnamed peak is 5225 ft, and is adjacent to Whitewater Draw of the lower stretch of Rucker Creek. A second unnamed peak is in the northeast, at 5847 ft and also adjacent to Rucker Creek.

Leslie Creek forms the eastern and southern border of the Swisshelm Mountains. The Chiricahuas are directly adjacent eastwards; the Pedregosa Mountains are southeast and are drained by a tributary of Leslie Creek, Big Bend Creek.

The historical area of Sunizona, Arizona is northwest-(Pearce, Arizona).

See also 
 Leslie Canyon National Wildlife Refuge
 List of Madrean Sky Island mountain ranges - Sonoran - Chihuahuan Deserts

References

External links 
 John Swisshelm history
 Climbing Swisshelm Mountain

Geology
 Ore deposits, northern Swisshelms

Mountain ranges of Cochise County, Arizona
Madrean Sky Islands mountain ranges
Mountain ranges of Arizona